Rantechaux is a former commune in the Doubs department in the Bourgogne-Franche-Comté region in eastern France.

History 
On 1 January 2016, Athose, Chasnans, Hautepierre-le-Châtelet, Nods, Rantechaux and Vanclans merged becoming one commune called Les Premiers-Sapins.

Population

See also 
 Communes of the Doubs department

References 

Former communes of Doubs